David Lawrence Schwimmer (born November 2, 1966) is an American actor, director and producer. He gained worldwide recognition for portraying Ross Geller in the sitcom Friends, for which he received a Screen Actors Guild Award and a Primetime Emmy Award nomination for Outstanding Supporting Actor in a Comedy Series in 1995. While still acting in Friends, his first leading film role was in The Pallbearer (1996), followed by roles in Kissing a Fool, Six Days, Seven Nights, Apt Pupil (all 1998), and Picking Up the Pieces (2000). He was then cast in the miniseries Band of Brothers (2001) as Herbert Sobel.

Schwimmer began his acting career performing in school plays at Beverly Hills High School. In 1988, he graduated from Northwestern University with a Bachelor of Arts in theater and speech. After graduation, Schwimmer co-founded the Lookingglass Theatre Company. For much of the late 1980s, he lived in Los Angeles as a struggling, unemployed actor, until he starred in the television movie A Deadly Silence in 1989 and appeared in a number of television roles in the early 1990s, including L.A. Law, The Wonder Years, NYPD Blue, and Monty.

After the series finale of Friends in 2004, Schwimmer branched out into film and stage work. He was cast as the title character in the 2005 drama film Duane Hopwood, and voiced Melman the Giraffe in the computer-animated Madagascar film franchise, acted in the dark comedy Big Nothing (2006), and the thriller Nothing but the Truth (2008). Schwimmer made his West End stage debut in the leading role in 2005's Some Girl(s). He made his Broadway debut in The Caine Mutiny Court-Martial in 2006. His feature film directorial debut followed in 2007 with the comedy Run Fatboy Run, and the following year he made his Off-Broadway directorial debut in Fault Lines.

In 2016, he starred as lawyer Robert Kardashian in The People v. O. J. Simpson, for which he received his second Primetime Emmy Award nomination, this time for Outstanding Supporting Actor in a Limited Series or Movie.

Early life
Schwimmer was born in Flushing, Queens, New York City, to attorneys Arthur (born 1941) and Arlene Coleman-Schwimmer (born 1940). His family is Jewish. He has an older sister named Ellie (born 1965). His family subsequently moved to Los Angeles, where Schwimmer, at 10, had his first acting experience when he was cast as the fairy godmother in a Jewish version of Cinderella. In 1979, Schwimmer went to a Shakespeare workshop given by English actor Sir Ian McKellen in Los Angeles. He recalls being riveted by the experience. Schwimmer then entered a contest in the Southern California Shakespeare Festival three years in a row, winning two first prizes.

Following his mother's successful career as a divorce lawyer, the family moved to Beverly Hills, where Schwimmer attended Beverly Hills High School. His classmates included actor Jonathan Silverman.  Schwimmer admitted to being an outsider during his time at the school, recalling, "When I was there I always felt: 'This is not me, I'm surrounded by people with a different value system. And I just wanted to get out of California.'" His best subjects were science and math and he thought he would become a doctor. Schwimmer enrolled in a drama class, where he appeared in stage productions. Encouraged by his school drama teacher to further his acting, he flew to Chicago for a summer acting program at Northwestern University. He noted that the experience was both "enlightening and exhilarating". In 1984, Schwimmer graduated from Beverly Hills High and wanted to go straight into acting, but his parents insisted he go to college first so he would have something to fall back on. Schwimmer enrolled in Northwestern University, where he had attended the summer acting program earlier. At the university, he studied theater and was in an improv group with Stephen Colbert, the No-Fun Mud Piranhas. After graduating in 1988, with a Bachelor of Arts degree in theater and speech, Schwimmer co-founded the Lookingglass Theatre Company. Subsequently, he returned to Los Angeles to pursue an acting career.

Career

1989–1994: Early work
After his supporting role debut in the ABC television movie A Deadly Silence (1989), Schwimmer followed this with roles on the legal drama L.A. Law in 1992, and the comedy-drama series The Wonder Years. He made his feature film debut in  Flight of the Intruder (1991), had a recurring role as a lawyer-turned-vigilante in NYPD Blue before auditioning, unsuccessfully, for a series pilot called Couples. He landed his first regular series role as the liberal son of a conservative talk show host (Henry Winkler) in the sitcom Monty.

1994–2004: Breakthrough

In 1994, Schwimmer was cast as Ross Geller in NBC's situation comedy Friends, a series that revolved around a group of friends who live near each other in Manhattan. He played a hopeless-romantic paleontologist who works at a museum and later becomes a professor at a university. Schwimmer initially turned down the role as Ross, but accepted later. Executive producer Kevin S. Bright said that he had previously worked with Schwimmer, the character of Ross was written with him in mind, and he was the first actor cast. The show debuted on September 22, 1994, and was watched by almost 22 million American viewers. Friends quickly developed a loyal audience, with the show and Schwimmer receiving strong reviews. The Pittsburgh Post-Gazette was complimentary of Schwimmer, calling him "terrific". Variety's television reviewer said: "All six of the principals, especially (Courteney) Cox and Schwimmer, appear resourceful and display sharp sitcom skills". For this performance, he earned a Primetime Emmy Award nomination for Outstanding Supporting Actor in a Comedy Series in 1995.

Schwimmer starred in his first leading film role in the 1996 romantic comedy film, The Pallbearer with Gwyneth Paltrow. In the film, Schwimmer plays a man asked to deliver the eulogy for a high school friend he cannot remember, and begins an affair with the friend's mother. Critics dismissed The Pallbearer as a poor imitation of the 1967 film The Graduate. Variety's film reviewer complimented the actor, writing that he had enjoyed his performance, stating that he displayed "a winning, if rather deadpan, personality along with good comic timing". It also concluded that Schwimmer had a "promising bigscreen future". Janet Maslin of The New York Times cited that his first film "relegates him to a drab role". When asked why he decided to accept the role, Schwimmer admitted the decision was to "make an effort to find roles that are as far away from the character of Ross as possible." He was offered a role to star alongside Tommy Lee Jones in the 1997 science-fiction comedy Men in Black after Chris O'Donnell turned down the role, but turned it down because of a prior commitment to direct his first film with his theatre company friends starring before the role was given to Will Smith.

His next film roles, in 1998, were Kissing a Fool, Six Days, Seven Nights, and Apt Pupil. In Kissing a Fool, a romantic comedy, Schwimmer played Max, a dapper, smart-mouthed ladies' man. Mick LaSalle of the San Francisco Chronicle wrote, "Fans of the sitcom Friends may be surprised by David Schwimmer in Kissing a Fool. [...] Take it from someone who has never seen Friends and comes at Schwimmer with no preconceptions: He does just fine. As a TV sports reporter in Kissing a Fool, he oozes the command and self-satisfaction of a young, successful man." The film was critically and financially unsuccessful. In Six Days, Seven Nights, he played the boyfriend of Anne Heche's character. In Apt Pupil, adapted from a novella of the same name by Stephen King, he had a supporting role as a school guidance counselor. "I was scared of the part", Schwimmer said, "but I wanted to be part of the movie". At the time, he noted it was a "little frustrating" that people would typecast him due to his role on Friends. He subsequently appeared opposite Woody Allen and Sharon Stone in Alfonso Arau's straight-to-cable comedy Picking Up the Pieces (2000).

In 2001, Schwimmer played Captain Herbert M. Sobel in Steven Spielberg and Tom Hanks' HBO World War II miniseries Band of Brothers. The television miniseries is based on the book of the same title written by historian and biographer Stephen Ambrose. Although Band of Brothers was met with largely positive reception, Schwimmer's performance was criticized; the BBC News concluded, "Part of the problem ... may have been the ridiculous fact that Friends favourite David Schwimmer plays the hard and cruel Captain Herbert Sobel. The only thing believable about Schwimmer's acting is when he cowers in the face of true battle. His puppy dog eyes make him appear even more pitiful." Later that year he portrayed Yitzhak Zuckerman in the war drama Uprising, based on the true events of the Warsaw Ghetto Uprising in 1943.

In March 2004, Schwimmer appeared as himself on HBO's comedy series Curb Your Enthusiasm. During the lengthy run of Friends, Schwimmer directed ten of the show's episodes. The show's tenth and final season ended on May 6, 2004.

2004–2010: Directing

After Friends, Schwimmer starred in the 2005 independent drama Duane Hopwood, as the title character, who is an alcoholic whose life is spiraling downward rapidly after a divorce and is looking to turn his life around. The film received ambivalent reviews. Despite the reception, Schwimmer's performance was favored by critics; Roger Ebert of the Chicago Sun-Times reported that the role was Schwimmer's "career-transforming performance." Duane Hopwood was screened at a special presentation at the 2005 Sundance Film Festival. Furthermore, in the same year he voiced Melman, a hypochondriac giraffe, in the computer animated film Madagascar (2005). The Washington Post noted that Schwimmer is particularly appealing as Melman. Despite the mixed response from critics, the film was a commercial success, earning US$532 million worldwide, making it one of the biggest hits of 2005.

Schwimmer starred on the London stage in May 2005, with Catherine Tate, Lesley Manville, Sara Powell, and Saffron Burrows, in Neil LaBute's Some Girl(s) at the Gielgud Theatre. In the production, he plays a teacher who is ready to settle down and marry, but decides to visit four ex-girlfriends first. For his performance, Schwimmer received critical reviews. The Independent wrote that Schwimmer "is not called upon to extend his range nearly as far as one might have expected in Some Girl(s). [...] Schwimmer remains bland, competent, and boyish—though not fatally boyish in the manner that appears to have turned these women on." However, Charles Spencer of The Daily Telegraph praised Schwimmer, reporting he "proves inspired casting. He takes to the stage with ... his endearing gaucheness seems designed to ensure our continued sympathy. Schwimmer mercilessly lays bare his character's opportunism, casual cruelties, and chronic self-deception."

In 2006, he made his Broadway debut in Herman Wouk's two-act play The Caine Mutiny Court-Martial. Schwimmer played the role of Lieutenant Barney Greenwald in the production, which was directed by Jerry Zaks. In an interview with New York magazine, he revealed that he had wanted to try Broadway, however said "a couple of things came up that just never quite felt right. Either because I liked the play but wasn’t hot on the director, or there was another star attached that I wasn't jazzed about working with." He further added that when showed a copy of Wouk's novel "...I was shocked at how good the writing was." His next film role was in the 2006 black comedy Big Nothing, in which he played a bitter, unemployed scientist.

Schwimmer made his directorial feature debut in the 2007 British comedy film Run Fatboy Run. The film stars Simon Pegg as an out of shape man who signs up for a marathon to convince his former fiancée and five-year-old son that he has turned his life around. When asked why he decided to direct the film, Schwimmer said: "As a director, I was struck by the challenge that I thought the script presented, which was that it was kind of three films in one. You had some great, big physical comedy, and I thought funny dialogue and characters. And then there was some real emotion to it with the relationship between the father and the son and the romance aspect." Run Fatboy Run garnered mixed reception, with the New York Daily News rating it one-and-a-half out of five stars and writing, "Most disappointing is how Schwimmer—who spent 10 seasons on a sitcom filled with hyperverbal characters—manages to bumble 'Fatboy's' tender moments." USA Today, however, was favorable towards Schwimmer, reporting he possesses filmmaking finesse "having wisely chosen strong comic material for his debut behind the camera." For his directorial work, he was nominated for a British Independent Film Award in the category of Best Debut Director.

On November 8, 2007, Schwimmer made a guest appearance in the second season of the television series 30 Rock, where he played Greenzo, an NBC environmental mascot. The following year, he was part of an ensemble cast that included Kate Beckinsale, Matt Dillon, Alan Alda, Angela Bassett, and Noah Wyle in the thriller Nothing But the Truth (2008). The movie received generally favorable reviews. The success of Madagascar led Schwimmer to return to the role of Melman in the 2008 sequel, Madagascar: Escape 2 Africa. The film earned US$603 million at the international box office. Schwimmer took part in directing in-studio segments for Little Britain USA, an American spin-off of the British BBC television series Little Britain. In regard to this, he commented that he had "a good time directing episodes" for the show.

In October 2008, Schwimmer made his Off-Broadway directorial debut in Fault Lines at the Cherry Lane Theatre in New York. The production won a mixed review from the Los Angeles Times, which wrote: "Based on Fault Lines ... we can't really tell whether Schwimmer has much talent as a director. We're surprised he didn't try something more challenging for his debut. If not much else, Schwimmer has encouraged his actors to intense their energy levels and comic timing at all costs". The New York Post, however, noted that Schwimmer "knows a thing or two about freewheeling banter ... and for a good while the play crackles with terrific dialogue, expertly delivered". In February 2009, he returned to theater in a Chicago production of Thornton Wilder's three-act play Our Town as George Gibbs at the Lookingglass Theatre. "Schwimmer ... turns in a poignant, richly textured and demonstrably heartfelt performance as George Gibbs. I've seen a fair bit of Schwimmer's post-Friends stage work in London and New York, and I've never seen him better", commented the Chicago Tribune.

On August 2, 2009, Schwimmer played himself in the sixth season of the HBO television series, Entourage. In the episode, Ari Gold's (Jeremy Piven) agency tries to steer his career back to television. Schwimmer directed his second feature, Trust, starring Clive Owen and Catherine Keener. The film, a drama, is about a family whose teenage daughter becomes victim of an online sexual predator. Trust premiered at the 2010 Toronto International Film Festival.

2010–present: Return to television
On January 1, 2011, Schwimmer guest-starred on the British comedy series Come Fly With Me starring Matt Lucas and David Walliams, whom he directed in Little Britain USA. The following year, he returned to voice Melman the Giraffe in Madagascar 3: Europe's Most Wanted.

Schwimmer appeared in the cast of The Iceman in 2013 as Josh Rosenthal, a mobster who was brought up by the notorious Roy Demeo and part of the Gambino Family. The movie starred Michael Shannon as Richard Kuklinski.

In 2014, Schwimmer was cast as the lead in the ABC comedy pilot Irreversible, playing "one half of a somewhat eccentric, self-absorbed couple". In 2016, Schwimmer played Robert Kardashian in the first season of the FX anthology series American Crime Story. He received a Primetime Emmy Award nomination for his performance. In January 2016,  Schwimmer and Jim Sturgess were cast to star in the new AMC crime drama Feed the Beast. The series premiered on June 5, 2016, and aired 10 episodes through August before being canceled. In November 2016, it was announced that Schwimmer would star in his first audio series. Gimlet Media's podcast Homecoming began airing on November 16, 2016.

In April 2017, Schwimmer helped adapt the films of Sigal Avin for a US audience. The six short features depict sexual harassment at work by men on women.

In 2020, Schwimmer was cast as a main character in a British sitcom, Intelligence broadcast on Sky One. 

In May 2020, Schwimmer was a celebrity reader on CBeebies Bedtime Stories

In late 2020 Schwimmer was signed as the face of British banking chain TSB.

Personal life
Schwimmer dated singer-songwriter Natalie Imbruglia in the late 1990s. Schwimmer and Jennifer Aniston admitted to having crushes on each other early on while filming Friends during HBO Max's Friends: The Reunion. Schwimmer began a relationship with British artist Zoë Buckman in 2007 and they married in June 2010. Their daughter was born in 2011. The couple announced in April 2017 that they were "taking some time apart". They divorced later that year.

Schwimmer primarily lives in East Village, Manhattan. He previously had a loft in Near West Side, Chicago as well as a house in Hancock Park, Los Angeles.

In June 2006, Schwimmer won a US$400,000 defamation lawsuit against Aaron Tonken, a former charity fundraiser. Tonken claimed Schwimmer had demanded Rolex watches in order to appear at his own charity event, a claim that Schwimmer had denied.

Schwimmer is an active director of the Rape Treatment Center in Santa Monica, which specializes in helping victims of date rape and child rape. He has also campaigned for legislation to ban drugs such as Rohypnol and GHB. In November 2011, he gave the Scottish charity Children 1st permission to screen his film Trust to commemorate World Day for Prevention of Child Abuse and Violence against Children.

In 2012, he rebutted two longstanding rumors: one that he appeared as a soldier on a train in Biloxi Blues (1988), saying, "No. I don't know why that's on IMDb, but I never was in that", and the other that he is related to dancer Lacey Schwimmer, saying, "No, not at all. Please set the record straight. I guess it's a natural assumption because we have the same last name, but no. I've never even met her".

Filmography

Film

Television

Director/producer

Awards and nominations 

Schwimmer has received two Primetime Emmy Award nominations, one in 1995 for his performance as Ross Geller on Friends and the other as Robert Kardashian in the Ryan Murphy limited series The People v. O.J. Simpson: American Crime Story in 2016. He also has received seven Screen Actors Guild Award nominations with one win for Outstanding Performance by an Ensemble in a Comedy Series for Friends.

See also
 Back Stage West Garland Awards, for his Lookingglass Theatre Company, production of Arabian Nights

References

External links

 
 Lawrence, Will. "David Schwimmer: From Central Perk to the East End." The Daily Telegraph. August 31, 2007. Accessed June 10, 2009.
 Greenstreet, Rosanna. "Q&A: David Schwimmer." The Guardian. September 8, 2007. Accessed June 10, 2009.
 Pratt, Steve. "New direction." The Northern Echo. September 8, 2007. Accessed June 10, 2009.
 Fanning, Evan. "Everyone wants to be his friend." Irish Independent. September 9, 2007. Accessed June 10, 2009.
 DiLiberto, Rebecca. "Indirect routes." The Boston Globe. March 23, 2008. Accessed June 10, 2009.

1966 births
Living people
20th-century American male actors
21st-century American male actors
Alumni of the British American Drama Academy
American male film actors
American male stage actors
American male television actors
American male voice actors
American people of German-Jewish descent
American television directors
American theatre directors
Back Stage West Garland Award recipients
Beverly Hills High School alumni
Film directors from Los Angeles
Film directors from New York (state)
Film directors from New York City
Jewish American male actors
Jewish theatre directors
Male actors from New York City
Northwestern University School of Communication alumni
People from Flushing, Queens
People from Greater Los Angeles
21st-century American Jews